Deborrea  griveaudi is a species of bagworm moth native to Madagascar.

Biology
This species has a  wingspan of 18.5–27 mm and it is known from southern Madagascar from the surroundings of  Tuléar (Andranovory).

See also
 List of moths of Madagascar

References
Bourgogne, 1982. Observations sur l'epiphyse tibiale. Description d'une espèce malgache et d'un genre africain nouveau (Lep., Psychidae). – Bulletin de la Société entomologique de France 87(5–6):212–216.
 

Psychidae
Lepidoptera of Madagascar
Moths described in 1982
Moths of Madagascar
Moths of Africa